Yan Pavol Stastny (born September 30, 1982) is a Canadian-born American former professional ice hockey centre. He comes from the Slovak Stastny ice hockey family, and is the son of Hockey Hall of Famer Peter Šťastný (one of the first star Eastern Bloc players to defect to the West). His uncles Anton and Marián Šťastný also played in the NHL, and his brother Paul Stastny plays for the Carolina Hurricanes.

Early life
Yan Stastny was born in Quebec City, but he moved to New Jersey and then to St. Louis at the age of 7 when his father joined the St. Louis Blues, and where he and his siblings were raised. As a youth, he played in the 1996 Quebec International Pee-Wee Hockey Tournament with the St. Louis Blues minor ice hockey team.

He played high school ice hockey for Chaminade College Preparatory School for two years, and then transferred to Parkway Central High School, because Chaminade would not let him miss classes to play junior ice hockey. During his final years of high school, he played for the Junior B St. Louis Jr. Blues and then the Junior A St. Louis Sting.

Yan's number 26 was retired by Chaminade College Preparatory School in honor of Yan and his brother Paul in August 2018.

Playing career

Amateur
Stastny played for the Omaha Lancers, a Junior A team in the United States Hockey League (USHL) during the 2000–01 season. He helped them win the Clark Cup playoff trophy and the Gold Cup National Championship over the Texas Tornado. After high school, he attended the University of Notre Dame for two years where he played for the Fighting Irish before being drafted into the NHL.

Professional
Stastny was drafted in the eighth round (259th overall) in the 2002 NHL entry draft. He played for Team USA in the 2005 IIHF World Championship, making the Stastnys the first ice hockey family known to have represented four different countries in international play (his father played for Czechoslovakia and Canada in the Canada Cup series in 1976 and 1984, and for Slovakia after the dissolution of Czechoslovakia).

After playing 51 games of the 2005–06 season with the American Hockey League (AHL)'s Iowa Stars, Stastny made his NHL debut on March 1, 2006, with the Edmonton Oilers against the St. Louis Blues, the last team for which his father played. Eight days later, he was traded by the Oilers back to the Boston Bruins along with Marty Reasoner and a 2006 second round pick (Milan Lucic) for Sergei Samsonov as part of an NHL trade deadline deal. He scored his first NHL goal for Boston in a 4-3 home loss against the Montreal Canadiens on April 13, 2006.  On January 16, 2007, the Boston Bruins traded him to the St. Louis Blues for a 2007 fifth round draft pick.

On March 3, 2010, the Blues traded him to the Vancouver Canucks for Pierre-Cédric Labrie. He never appeared with the Canucks, instead playing with AHL affiliate, the Manitoba Moose, to conclude the 2009–10 season. On June 29, 2010, Stastny joined CSKA Moscow of the Kontinental Hockey League (KHL).

After a season with Mora IK in the HockeyAllsvenskan, Stastny returned to the German Deutsche Eishockey Liga (DEL), signing an initial try-out contract with the Schwenninger Wild Wings on August 2, 2015. He later secured a one-year deal on August 31.

As a free agent the following off-season, Stastny returned to North America after six European seasons, agreeing to a professional try-out contract to attend the training camp with his former club, the St. Louis Blues, joining his brother Paul, on September 10, 2016.

After Stastny failed to make the Blues he signed with HC Vítkovice Ridera of the Czech Extraliga (ELH) in October 2016. For the 2017–18 season, Stastny signed with EHC Lustenau of the Alps Hockey League and set a career high in goals with 25. He has not signed with a team since.

Career statistics

Regular season and playoffs

International

See also
 Notable families in the NHL

References

External links
 

1982 births
Living people
American men's ice hockey centers
American people of Canadian descent
American people of Slovak descent
Boston Bruins draft picks
Boston Bruins players
Canadian expatriate ice hockey players in Germany
Canadian expatriate ice hockey players in Russia
Canadian expatriate ice hockey players in Sweden
Canadian ice hockey centres
Canadian people of Slovak descent
Chaminade College Preparatory School (Missouri) alumni
Edmonton Oilers players
HC CSKA Moscow players
HC Vítkovice players
Ice hockey people from St. Louis
Ice hockey people from Quebec City
Iowa Stars players
EHC Lustenau players
Manitoba Moose players
Mora IK players
Notre Dame Fighting Irish men's ice hockey players
Nürnberg Ice Tigers players
Omaha Lancers players
Peoria Rivermen (AHL) players
Providence Bruins players
Schwenninger Wild Wings players
St. Louis Blues players
Thomas Sabo Ice Tigers players
Canadian expatriate ice hockey players in Austria
American expatriate ice hockey players in Austria
American expatriate ice hockey players in Russia
American expatriate ice hockey players in Sweden
American expatriate ice hockey players in Germany
American expatriate ice hockey players in the Czech Republic
Canadian expatriate ice hockey players in the Czech Republic